Randolph, also known as Old Randolph, was an unincorporated area in Houston County, Texas.

History 
It was founded in 1838 by Cyrus Halbert Randolph. By 1860, it had a school, a post office, a saloon, a blacksmith, a barber shop, and a Masonic lodge. During that time, it rivaled Crockett for the county seat, but declined after the American Civil War. It was completely abandoned by 1900. Today, only a cemetery remains.

Education 
Any students who might live in the area would be zoned in the Kennard Independent School District.

References

Ghost towns in Texas
Geography of Houston County, Texas